Dr. Karim Mahdi Salih is an Iraqi politician who was the Transport Minister of Iraq in the government of Nouri al-Maliki from May 2006 until April 2007. He is a member of the Sadrist Movement within the United Iraqi Alliance.

In July, Salih offered his resignation as Transport Minister, along with fellow Sadrist ministers Liwa Sumaysim and Sa'd Tahir Al-Hashimi. The Agriculture Minister, Ya'rub Nazim al-Abbudi was reported to have been appointed as temporary Transport Minister in his place. Moqtadr al-Sadr was reported to have said the three ministers "lacked the necessary qualifications and experience to run their ministries". However he was still in his position four months later

Sources

Government ministers of Iraq
Living people
Year of birth missing (living people)